The 2001 edition of R League was held from April 19 to September 27, 2001. From this year, Police FC. 

Anyang LG Cheetahs won the competition for the first time by defeating Seongnam Ilhwa Chunma in final on 27 September 2001.

League standing

Central League

Southern League

Championship playoff

Semi-finals

Final
First leg

Second leg

External links
 R League 2001 table & result 

R League seasons
2001 in South Korean football